Surat Khatamovich Ikramov (1945 – 3 May 2021) was an Uzbek human rights activist and a prominent critic of Uzbekistan’s authoritarian government. Ikramov was the chair of the Initiative Group of Independent Human Rights Defenders. Since its founding in 2002, the group became one of the most prolific chroniclers of human rights abuses in Uzbekistan, Central Asia's most populous state and an important Western ally in the Afghanistan war.

Biography 
Ikramov was born in Tashkent in 1945. He studied radio technology, and worked in a printing house, a photographic studio, and taught in a college, and later headed a company producing educational materials.

In 2003, Ikramov was kidnapped, severely beaten, bound in a sack, and thrown in a secluded ditch. Given his background, Human Rights Watch said "we suspect that there may be more to this incident than mere criminal thuggery." Ikramov regularly attended trials, talked to victims and compiled dispatches which he emailed to diplomats, journalists and government officials. In a country with no independent media, his dispatches provided a rare window into the workings of Uzbekistan's repressive legal and political system. An archive of his dispatches is available at www.ignpu.net.

Much of Ikramov's work focused on exposing mistreatment, alleged fabrication of evidence, and torture of detainees, particularly those accused of religious extremism. An engineer by training, Ikramov became a human rights defender by accident. In the 1990s, he set up a small printing business, and when a state-owned factory broke his equipment, he sued and lost. He got in touch with other human-rights defenders, and eventually became one himself. Ikramov was unstinting in his criticism of the ruling regime of longtime President Islam Karimov. In a May 2010 dispatch marking the five-year anniversary of a government crackdown on protesters in Andijan, Ikramov called it "one of the most horrible crimes of the Karimov regime" that remains "uninvestigated and unpunished." The government claims it was fighting terrorists.

Ikramov was sued in a case involving the suspicious death of a famous Uzbek singer. According to the official version, she hanged herself. But Ikramov suggested she may have been murdered, and implicated the relatives of the singer's boyfriend, who was a brother of Uzbekistan's interior minister. A court ruled against Ikramov, and ordered him to pay a fine to the plaintiffs. Ikramov appealed.

Ikramov died in Tashkent on 3 May 2021.

References

 
 
 
World Briefing | Asia: Uzbekistan: Opposition Leader On Trial New York Times

External links
 
 
 
 

1945 births
2021 deaths
Uzbekistani human rights activists
People from Tashkent